Maindroniidae is a very small family of silverfish, basal insects belonging to the order Zygentoma. It contains just a single genus, Maindronia, and a handful of species.

Four species of these insects are found in some of the driest deserts on Earth: in Sudan, the Arabian Peninsula, and the Atacama Desert on the west coast of Chile. The distribution of these closely related species suggests that Maindronia is a Gondwanan relict group. A new species in this family was recently discovered in Hormozgan province, Iran.

Maindronia currently comprises four described species:

 Maindronia bashagardensis Smith & Molero-Baltanás, 2020  – Iran
 Maindronia beieri Schremmer, 1964 – Sudan
 Maindronia mascatensis Bouvier, 1897 – Oman and UAE
 Maindronia neotropicalis Bouvier, 1897 – Peru and Chile

Recent findings from a phylogenetic study using the Cytochrome c oxidase subunit I and the 18S genes showed that Maindronia neotropicalis, inhabiting the Chilean Atacama desert, is in fact an assemblage of five genetic lineages that diverged from a common ancestor around 15 million years ago. All of these five lineages are likely well-separated species, and they await formal description.

References

External links
Systematics of family
 

Zygentoma
Insect families
Monogeneric insect families